George Z. Singal (born October 27, 1945) is a senior United States district judge of the United States District Court for the District of Maine and also serves as a Judge on the United States Foreign Intelligence Surveillance Court.

Education and career

Singal was born in a refugee camp in Florence, Italy in 1945. His family emigrated to Bangor, Maine, in 1948. He subsequently became a naturalized American citizen. He received a Bachelor of Arts degree from the University of Maine in 1967. He received a Juris Doctor from Harvard Law School in 1970. He was in private practice of law in Maine from 1970 to 2000. He was an assistant county attorney of Office of the County Attorney, Maine from 1971 to 1973. He was a Complaint justice, Bangor in 1974.

Federal judicial service

Singal is a United States District Judge of the United States District Court for the District of Maine. Singal was nominated by President Bill Clinton on May 11, 2000, to a seat vacated by Morton A. Brody. He was confirmed by the United States Senate on June 30, 2000, and received commission on July 11, 2000. He served as chief judge from 2003 to 2009. He took senior status on July 31, 2013.

Foreign Intelligence Surveillance Court

On May 15, 2019, Chief Justice John Roberts appointed Singal to the Foreign Intelligence Surveillance Court for a term beginning May 19, 2019.

See also
List of Jewish American jurists

References

Sources

1945 births
Living people
Italian emigrants to the United States
People from Bangor, Maine
University of Maine alumni
Harvard Law School alumni
Judges of the United States District Court for the District of Maine
United States district court judges appointed by Bill Clinton
20th-century American judges
Judges of the United States Foreign Intelligence Surveillance Court
21st-century American judges
American people of Italian descent